David Courtney Boyle (born 1958) is a British author and journalist who writes mainly about history and new ideas in economics, money, business, and culture. He lives in Steyning in West Sussex. He conducted an independent review for the Treasury and the Cabinet Office on public demand for choice in public services which reported in 2013. He is co-founder and policy director of Radix, which he characterized in 2017 as a radical centrist think tank. He is also co-director of the mutual think tank New Weather Institute.

Writing
His book Authenticity put the phenomenon on the business and political agenda. His previous books The Tyranny of Numbers and The Sum of Our Discontent predicted and fermented the backlash against target culture.  Funny Money helped launched the time banks movement in the UK.
More recently, his writing has suggested why organisations and public services can be ineffective. He worked with the New Economics Foundation and NESTA on a series of publications about coproduction. His solutions are also published in The Human Element. This argues that organisations have abandoned human skills in favour of numerical targets or IT systems, which frustrate the business of building relationships and making things happen. He helped to launch the popular campaign against the failures of the Southern Rail franchise with his book Cancelled!, and his experimental 'passenger strike' in 2017.

His history books usually have a business or economic dimension, including Blondel's Song (UK) and The Troubadour's Song (USA) about the imprisonment and ransom of Richard the Lionheart. His 2008 book Toward the Setting Sun tells the intertwined story of Christopher Columbus, John Cabot and Amerigo Vespucci and their race for America in the 1490s. His 2010 book, Eminent Corporations (with Andrew Simms) has introduced a new genre, the mini-corporate biography, launching the idea of corporate history as tragedy. His 2013 book Broke argued that the middle classes were also being squeezed by the political and economic elite.

He has been the editor of several non-peer-reviewed journals including New Economics and Town & Country Planning. He is a fellow of the New Economics Foundation.

He was editor of the weekly Liberal Democrat News from 1992–1998. He edited the Foundation's publications New Economics, News from the New Economy, and then Radical Economics from 1987–2010.

Other work
He has been involved with developing coproduction and introducing time banks to Britain as part of public service reform, developing the idea of coproduction with the innovation agency Nesta. He has been involved in the Clone Town Britain campaign and writes about the future of volunteering, cities and business.

Boyle helped found the London Time Bank, and was co-founder of Time Banking UK. He has been a candidate for Parliament of the United Kingdom, and sat on the federal policy committee of the Liberal Democrats from 1998-2012. He was Lib Dem Blogger of the Year 2013.

Bibliography
Building Futures, 1989
What is New Economics?, 1993
Alternative Identities, Alternative Currencies, 1999
Funny Money: In search of alternative cash, 1999 
The Sum of Our Discontent, 2001
The Tyranny of Numbers, 2001 
The Little Money Book, 2003
The Money Changers: Currency Reform from Aristotle to e-cash, 2003
Numbers, 2004
Authenticity: Brands, Fakes, Spin and the Lust for Real Life, 2004
The Troubadour's Song: The Capture and Ransom of Richard the Lionheart, 2005
Blondel's Song: The Capture, Imprisonment and Ransom of Richard the Lionheart, 2005
Leaves the World to Darkness 2007
Toward the Setting Sun: Columbus, Cabot and Vespucci and the Race for America 2008
Co-production: A manifesto for growing the core economy 2008
The New Economics: A Bigger Picture with Andrew Simms (2009) Routledge 
Money Matters (2009) 
The Wizard (2010) 
Eminent Corporations with Andrew Simms (2010) 
Voyages of Discovery (2011) 
The Human Element: Ten new rules to kickstart our failing organizations 2011
Broke: Who Killed the Middle Classes? (2013) Fourth Estate 
The Age to Come. Authenticity, Postmodernism and How to Survive What Comes Next (2013)
How to be English Square Peg (2015) 978-0224100977
Alan Turing: Unlocking the Enigma Endeavour Press/Real Press (2015) 978-1500985370

References

External links
 David Boyle's official site
 Guardian Unlimited Politics – Ask Aristotle: David Boyle
 Meet the Lib Dem bloggers Q&A
 New Weather Institute, co-operative think tank associated with Boyle
  Radix, radical centrist think tank associated with Boyle

1958 births
Living people
British economics writers
Liberal Democrats (UK) parliamentary candidates
People from Crystal Palace, London
Radical centrist writers